Dendrelaphis cyanochloris, commonly known as Wall's bronzeback or the blue bronzeback, is a species of snake found in Southeast Asia.

Distribution
The species occurs in India (Assam, Arunachal Pradesh (Namdapha - Changlang district);  Andaman Islands, northern parts of West Bengal), Bangladesh, Myanmar, southern Thailand, and western Malaysia (Pulau Pinang, Pahang, Pulau Tioman), possibly also in Bhutan. It is predominantly arboreal and inhabits primary and mature secondary lowland rainforest, at altitudes of up to 1,000 m.

Description

Like other bronzebacks, this snake is diurnal and fully arboreal.

Conservation
Common and widespread, Wall's bronzeback is currently classified as Least Concern by the IUCN, although it is likely impacted by localized habitat loss and degradation from agricultural expansion and logging.

References

Further reading
 Das, I. 1999 Biogeography of the amphibians and reptiles of the Andaman and Nicobar Islands, India. In: Ota,H. (ed) Tropical Island herpetofauna.., Elsevier, pp. 43–77
 Wall. F. 1921 Remarks on the Indian species of Dendrophis and Dendrelaphis. Rec. Ind. Mus. Calcutta, 22: 151 - 162

External links
 

cyanochloris
Least concern biota of Asia
Snakes of Southeast Asia
Reptiles of Bangladesh
Reptiles of India
Reptiles of Malaysia
Reptiles of Myanmar
Reptiles of Thailand
Reptiles described in 1921
Taxa named by Frank Wall